Alexander Joppich (born 19 January 1995) is an Austrian professional footballer who plays as left-back for 2. Liga club SV Horn.

Club career
He made his Austrian Football First League debut for FC Liefering on 12 September 2014 in a game against SV Mattersburg.

On 14 June 2022, Joppich signed a two-year contract with 2. Liga club SV Horn.

References

External links
 

1995 births
People from Hall in Tirol
Living people
Austrian footballers
Austria youth international footballers
FC Augsburg II players
FC Liefering players
SC Austria Lustenau players
FC Wacker Innsbruck (2002) players
SV Horn players
Austrian expatriate footballers
Expatriate footballers in Germany
Regionalliga players
2. Liga (Austria) players
Association football defenders
Footballers from Tyrol (state)
Austrian expatriate sportspeople in Germany